John Ellis is the current director of studies for Natural Sciences at the Gonville and Caius College, Cambridge. He was born in London in 1963 and is best known for his research on Helium-3 surface spin echo, an inelastic scattering technique.

Early life and education
Ellis studied at St John's College, Cambridge where he obtained a first-class degree in Natural Sciences. He obtained a Ph.D in surface physics from the Cavendish Laboratory, Cambridge. He then spent three years at the Max Planck Institute for Dynamics and Self-Organization in Göttingen during which he continued using helium scattering to probe surface structure and dynamics. Thereafter, he returned to Cambridge as a fellow of Lloyd's Tercentenary Research Foundation, later progressing to an EPSRC Advanced Fellow. He went on to become the Assistant Director of Research at the Cavendish Laboratory where he led the development of the Cavendish’s spin-echo instrument and research project.

Research 
Ellis specialises in surface physics and imaging techniques.

Helium-3 spin-echo spectroscopy
This technique has the potential for measurements on a nanoscale distance and over picosecond timescales. Ellis published a complete review of the current progress and future scientific challenges in this field in 2009 and his work remains one of the most cited papers in this field. Ellis has secured over 2 millions pounds worth of funding for research into this technique.

Published works 

Ultrahigh-Resolution Spin-Echo Measurement of Surface Potential Energy Landscapes Science (2004) ISSN 0036-8075.
A design for a pinhole scanning helium microscope Nuclear Instruments and Methods in Physics Research Section B: Beam Interactions with Materials and Atoms (2014)  ISSN 0168-583X.

These papers have obtained more than 300 citations respectively.

Awards
Dr. Ellis was nominated for the Student-Led Teaching Awards in 2019. This is an award given by the Cambridge University Students' Union annually with the nominations made by the students themselves.

Teaching
Ellis has taught many subjects in the Physics tripos including electrodynamics, classical dynamics and thermodynamics.

References

Year of birth missing (living people)
Living people
British physicists
Alumni of St John's College, Cambridge